During the 2009–10 English football season, Scunthorpe United F.C. competed in the Football League Championship.

Season summary
Scunthorpe struggled all season on their return to the Championship, but eventually managed to survive. The goals of Gary Hooper, who was third-highest top-scorer in the Championship with 19, ahead of the likes of Charlie Adam and Andy Carroll, were crucial to the club's survival, but he left at the end of the season to join Scottish giants Celtic. His strike partner, Paul Hayes, also left, to Preston North End, making Scunthorpe's task of surviving in the Championship for a second consecutive season all the more difficult.

Kit
Scunthorpe's kit was manufactured by Carlotti and sponsored by Rainham Steel, with Smith's Fashion as secondary kit sponsors. Scunthorpe's home kits reverted to stripes for the first time since 1992, with the home kits featuring blue shirts, black shorts and blue socks with black turnovers.

Squad

Left club during season

Competitions

League

August

A bruising return to life back in the Championship for Scunthorpe began with a 0-4 thrashing at the brand new Cardiff City Stadium which saw them immediately sink to the bottom of the table, although a win at home to Derby offered some form of redemption as well as hope that survival may not be beyond them. Defeats at home to recently relegated Middlesbrough and QPR, interspersed with another mauling on their travels at Sheffield Wednesday, meant that the Iron ended August having lost 4 out of 5 league games. Two wins in the League Cup provided some light relief as Scunny progressed into the third round of the competition.

September

September began with a much greater encouragement as Scunthorpe kickstarted their season with an impressive 4–0 win at Crystal Palace, followed up with victory over Preston at Glanford Park. A pair of injury-time equalisers (both from Grant McCann), first at Bristol City then again at home to Doncaster, pushed them up to 15th in the early season table, before their 4-match unbeaten run was ended by Nottingham Forest at the City Ground.

Scunthorpe United F.C. seasons
Scunthorpe United F.C.